2-Fluorobenzoic acid is an aromatic organic compound with the formula FC6H4CO2H. It is one of three isomeric fluorobenzoic acids. Its conjugate base is 2-fluorobenzoate. The compound is an irritant.

Its metabolism has been studied extensively in the field of microbiology. Its conjugate base is part of the pathway of 2-fluorobiphenyl metabolism by Pseudomonas pseudoalcaligenes.

See also 
 4-Fluorobenzoic acid, the para isomer
 3-Fluorobenzoic acid, the meta isomer
 2-Chlorobenzoic acid

References

Benzoic acids
Fluoroarenes